Register is a town in Bulloch County, Georgia, United States. The population was 175 at the 2010 census.

The community was named after Frank Register, a pioneer citizen.

Geography
Register is located at  (32.366495, -81.883543).

Demographics

As of the census of 2000, there were 164 people, 68 households, and 39 families residing in the town. The racial makeup of the town was 90.24% White, 8.54% African American, 0.61% Asian, 0.61% from other races. Hispanic or Latino of any race were 3.05% of the population.

There were 68 households, out of which 27.9% had children under the age of 18 living with them, 48.5% were married couples living together, 8.8% had a female householder with no husband present, and 41.2% were non-families. 35.3% of all households were made up of individuals, and 14.7% had someone living alone who was 65 years of age or older. The average household size was 2.41 and the average family size was 3.23.

In the town, the population was spread out, with 29.3% under the age of 18, 7.9% from 18 to 24, 27.4% from 25 to 44, 21.3% from 45 to 64, and 14.0% who were 65 years of age or older. The median age was 33 years. For every 100 females, there were 88.5 males. For every 100 females age 18 and over, there were 75.8 males.

The median income for a household in the town was $20,500, and the median income for a family was $32,500. Males had a median income of $21,250 versus $20,000 for females. The per capita income for the town was $14,009. None of the families and 10.1% of the population were living below the poverty line, including no under eighteens and 19.4% of those over 64.

References

Towns in Bulloch County, Georgia
Towns in Georgia (U.S. state)
Populated places established in 1982